Charles Schaeffer may refer to:

 Charles Ashmead Schaeffer (1843–1898), President of the University of Iowa
 Charles Frederic August Schaeffer (1860–1934), American entomologist 
 Charles William Schaeffer (1813–1896), American Lutheran clergyman and theologian
 Charles Frederick Schaeffer (1807–1879), American Lutheran clergyman
 Charles Schäffer (1838–1903), American physician and botanist